KPIF (channel 15) is a television station licensed to Pocatello, Idaho, United States, serving the Idaho Falls–Pocatello media market as an affiliate of the digital multicast network Grit. It is owned by Ventura Broadcasting alongside Ion Television affiliate KVUI (channel 31, also licensed to Pocatello). The two stations share studios on West Alameda Road in Pocatello; KPIF's transmitter is located on Howard Mountain.

History
The original construction permit for KPIF was granted on March 2, 2001, to Pocatello Channel 15, L.L.C., a partnership between KM Communications, Inc. of Skokie, Illinois, Kaleidoscope Foundation, Inc. of Little Rock, Arkansas (a subsidiary of Equity Broadcasting Corporation), and Potelco Broadcasting of Greensboro, North Carolina. The three companies had been competing applicants for a channel 15 television station in Pocatello, and agreed in 2000 to form a partnership in order to expedite construction of the station. In 2003, due to irreconcilable differences that caused delays in development of the permit, Myoung Hwa Bae of KM Communications extended an offer to buy out the other two members. KM Communications completed construction of the station and signed on in March 2004 under Program Test Authority from the Federal Communications Commission (FCC). The station applied for a license to cover the construction permit on March 1, 2004, and was granted the license on October 11, 2006.

Initially, KPIF was affiliated with America One, but the station picked up a WB affiliation in July 2004. It became an affiliate of The CW on September 18, 2006. At one point, KBEO (channel 11) from Jackson, Wyoming (which was the first to sign on, on March 30, 2001) became a satellite of KPIF (KBEO has since gone dark).

After The CW moved to a digital subchannel of ABC affiliate KIFI-TV (channel 8) on September 7, 2009, the station switched to RTV (later RTN, now Retro TV).

Technical information

Subchannels
The station's digital signal is multiplexed:

As of November 2021, Grit moved from 15.2 to the main subchannel. A few other subchannels changed their affiliations too, including 15.2 (Heroes & Icons to Defy TV), 15.3 (Grit to TrueReal), 15.4 (Stadium to Bounce TV; the latter network previously aired on 15.4 from 2020 to June 2021), and 15.7 (Pursuit Channel to Newsy).

Analog-to-digital conversion
KPIF shut down its analog signal, over UHF channel 15, on June 12, 2009, and "flash-cut" its digital signal into operation on UHF channel 15, as they were granted original construction permits after the FCC finalized the DTV allotment plan on April 21, 1997.

While KPIF did broadcast a digital signal after the analog shutdown, it did not apply for a license to cover or an extension of the digital construction permit (which expired on June 12, 2009) until 2014. KPIF was granted a broadcast license for its digital signal on February 6, 2016.

References

External links
 Post Register article on station sign-on

Television channels and stations established in 2004
2004 establishments in Idaho
PIF
Grit (TV network) affiliates
Defy TV affiliates
TrueReal affiliates
Bounce TV affiliates
This TV affiliates
Court TV affiliates
Scripps News affiliates
True Crime Network affiliates
Daystar (TV network) affiliates